Stansted or Steanstead Hall was the country seat of the Earls of Essex during the reign of Henry VIII of England.

It is now owned by the Arthur Findlay College, a college of spiritualism and psychic sciences.

References

External links
The Arthur Findlay College

Tudor England
Houses in Essex
Houses completed in 1871
Stansted Mountfitchet